Tomorrow Square is the eighth-tallest building in Shanghai, China. It is located in Huangpu District, Puxi, close to People's Square. It is about 285 m (934 ft) tall and has 63 floors.

This multi-purpose building contains a 342-room JW Marriott hotel, and 255 executive apartment units. It was completed on 1 October 2003. Starting from a square base, the all-concrete Tomorrow Square tower transforms itself into a diagonal square as it rises to a peak. Engineers of the exterior vertical support system were faced with a unique challenge as a result of this unusual shape. They chose flat slabs for the hotel floors and beam and slab construction for the office floors. A combination of sheer walls and frame action stabilizes the slender tower laterally against wind and earthquake forces. The foundations are -long bored piles supporting a column mat.

See also

 List of tallest buildings in Shanghai

External links
 JW Marriott Hotel Shanghai
 Marriott Executive Apartments
 
 
 

Residential buildings completed in 2003
Skyscrapers in Shanghai
John C. Portman Jr. buildings
Residential skyscrapers in China
Skyscraper office buildings in Shanghai
Skyscraper hotels in Shanghai
Huangpu District, Shanghai
JW Marriott Hotels